In algebra, the principal factor of a -class J of a semigroup S is equal to J if J is the kernel of S, and to  otherwise.

Properties 
 A principal factor is a simple, 0-simple or null semigroup.

References

Further reading 
.
 .
.

Semigroup theory